Tema Filanovskaya (7 August 1915, Yekaterinburg — 13 December 1994, Yekaterinburg) was a Soviet chess player who three times won the Russian SFSR Women Chess Championship (1951, 1954, 1955).

Chess career
Tema Filanovskaya was one of the strongest female players of Russian SFSR and Sverdlovsk city. Four-time women's chess champion of the city of Sverdlovsk (1939, 1949, 1959, 1961), three time women's chess champion of the Sverdlovsk Oblast (1939, 1960, 1964), and three time women's chess champion of the Russian Soviet Federative Socialist Republic (1951, 1954–55). From 1946 to 1962 she nine times participated in the USSR Women's Chess Championship. Also Tema Filanovskaya as Russian SFRS chess team member two time won Soviet Team Chess Championship (1951, 1955).

She worked as an engineer economist, was a member of the Soviet sports society Iskra. During the World War II Tema Filanovskaya took part in the patronage of hospital work and played chess simultaneous exhibition in hospitals.

Buried at the Northern ("Severnyj") cemetery in Yekaterinburg.

Literature
 Игорь Бердичевский. Шахматная еврейская энциклопедия. Москва: Русский шахматный дом, 2016.

References

1915 births
1994 deaths
Sportspeople from Yekaterinburg
Russian female chess players
Soviet female chess players
20th-century chess players
Russian people of Jewish descent
Jewish chess players